Acıpınar can refer to:

 Acıpınar, Aksaray
 Acıpınar, Çorum